The  is a mountain pass that lies between Nagano and Gunma prefecture in Japan. It has served as one of the major transportation routes in central Japan since at least the eighth century.

Road 
The pass on the ancient Tōsandō highway was described as early as the 8th century, in the Nihon Shoki, as Yamato Takeru went through the pass during his journey in eastern Japan. Later, the Nakasendō, one of the five routes of the Edo period maintained by the Tokugawa shogunate (and one of the two that connected Edo, modern-day Tokyo, to Kyoto) followed the route through the pass.

The modern National Route 18, which goes through the pass, serves as a major link between the popular tourist spot Karuizawa and the Kantō plain (including Tokyo). A bypass and an expressway now make the trip faster and safer. The original road still exists as of 2013.

The Usui Pass is the home course of drift racer Keiichi Tsuchiya. It was also featured in the racing manga Initial D as the home course of the team Impact Blue where the protagonist, Takumi Fujiwara races a SilEighty driven by Mako Sato.

Railway 

The Shin'etsu Main Line railway went through the pass between 1893 and 1997. The 11.2 km pass segment, between Yokokawa Station on the Gunma side and Karuizawa Station on the Nagano side, had been operated with the rack-and-pinion railway system until 1963 when the line was rebuilt and new locomotives for non-rack operation were introduced. The new locomotives were the JNR Class EF63 banking engines used for help in both ascending and descending the 6.7% (1 in 15) gradient line. In 1997, the segment was closed due to opening of the new Nagano Shinkansen line that detours the pass with a long tunnel. A museum now stands on the site of the old locomotive shed at Yokokawa. A link to archival footage of the rack railway operation is available here

The prior-1963 line was featured in the Rail Wars! episodes 8 and 9, where the characters take it with a Draisine.

References

Mountain passes of Japan
Shin'etsu Main Line
Railway lines opened in 1893
Railway lines closed in 1997